Gabriela Szabo (born 14 November 1975) is a retired Romanian runner. She competed in the 1500 m and 5000 m events at the 1996 and 2000 Olympics and won a gold, a silver and a bronze medal.

Szabo is a three-time world champion. Throughout her entire career she was coached by Zsolt Gyöngyössy, whom she eventually married. In May 2005 she retired from competitions due to exhaustion. She held the European record in the 3000 m between 2002–2019.

Early life
Szabo was born to a Romanian mother and a Hungarian father. As a child, Szabo used to speak Hungarian with her friends, but she can only understand a few words today, which she regrets.

Post-sport career

As of 19 August 2013 she held the honorific title of Romanian Tourism Ambassador, together with 7 other cultural and sport personalities of Romania.

On 5 March 2014, she was appointed Minister of Youth and Sport in the Victor Ponta social-democratic government. She held the position until 17 November 2015.

Competition record

Personal bests

Outdoor (track)
1500 metres - 3:56.97 (1998)
One mile - 4:19.30 (1998)
3000 metres - 8:21.42 (2002)
5000 metres - 14:31.48 (1998)

Indoor
1500 metres - 4:03.23 (1999)
One mile - 4:23.19 (2001)
2000 metres - 5:30.53 (1998)
3000 metres - 8:32.88 (2001)
5000 metres - 14:47.35 (1999)

2001 Accident
Szabo is remembered for a collision with German long-jumper Kofi Amoah Prah during an indoor meeting at Stuttgart in 2001. Szabo was leaving the track after her competition had finished while Amoah was running for his attempt. Szabo walked into Amoah's path and they collided heavily.

References

External links

 Official website of Gabi Szabo
 

1975 births
Living people
Romanian female middle-distance runners
Romanian female long-distance runners
Olympic athletes of Romania
Olympic gold medalists for Romania
Olympic silver medalists for Romania
Olympic bronze medalists for Romania
Athletes (track and field) at the 1996 Summer Olympics
Athletes (track and field) at the 2000 Summer Olympics
Sportspeople from Bistrița
Romanian sportspeople of Hungarian descent
World Athletics Championships medalists
European Athletics Championships medalists
Romanian sportsperson-politicians
Romanian Ministers of Regional Development
Social Democratic Party (Romania) politicians
Medalists at the 2000 Summer Olympics
Medalists at the 1996 Summer Olympics
Olympic gold medalists in athletics (track and field)
Olympic silver medalists in athletics (track and field)
Olympic bronze medalists in athletics (track and field)
Universiade medalists in athletics (track and field)
IAAF Golden League winners
European Athlete of the Year winners
Track & Field News Athlete of the Year winners
Universiade gold medalists for Romania
World Athletics Indoor Championships winners
World Athletics Championships winners
Medalists at the 1995 Summer Universiade
Medalists at the 1997 Summer Universiade